William Hungate may refer to:

William L. Hungate, US Representative
William Hungate (MP), member of the Parliament of England for Marlborough